The 2010 Copa Petrobras Asunción was a professional tennis tournament played on clay courts. It was the fifth edition of the tournament which is part of the 2010 ATP Challenger Tour. It took place in Asunción, Paraguay between 12 and 17 October 2010.

ATP entrants

Seeds

 Rankings are as of October 4, 2010.

Other entrants
The following players received wildcards into the singles main draw:
  José Acasuso
  Fabio Fognini
  Diego Galeano
  Daniel-Alejandro Lopez

The following players received entry from the qualifying draw:
  Pablo Galdón
  Patricio Heras
  Joaquín-Jesús Monteferrario
  Marco Trungelliti

Champions

Singles

 Rui Machado def.  Ramón Delgado, 6–2, 3–6, 7–5

Doubles

 Fabio Fognini /  Paolo Lorenzi def.  Carlos Berlocq /  Brian Dabul, 6–3, 6–4

External links
Copa Petrobras de Tênis official website
ITF Search 
ATP World Tour official website

Copa Petrobras Asuncion
Clay court tennis tournaments